Henry Richard Kirby (19 March 1889 – 20 July 1976) was an English cricketer. Kirby's batting style is unknown. He was born at Patrixbourne, Kent, and was educated at Malvern College.

Kirby made a single first-class appearance for Sussex against Cambridge at Fenner's in 1911. Sussex won the toss and elected to bat, making 405 all out, with Kirby scoring 7 runs before he was dismissed by Norman Holloway. Cambridge University responded in their first-innings by making 247 all out. Forced to follow-on in their second-innings, Cambridge University made 437 all out, setting Sussex 280 for victory. However, in their second-innings chase, Sussex were dismissed for 238, with Kirby being dismissed for 2 runs by Alexander Cowie. Cambridge University won the match by 41 runs. This was his only major appearance for Sussex.

He died at Mayfield, Sussex, on 20 July 1976.

References

External links
Henry Kirby at ESPNcricinfo
Henry Kirby at CricketArchive

1889 births
1976 deaths
Sportspeople from Canterbury
People educated at Malvern College
English cricketers
Sussex cricketers
People from Mayfield, East Sussex
People from the City of Canterbury